The Syro-Malankara Catholic Major Archeparchy of Trivandrum is a  Syro-Malankara Catholic Church ecclesiastical territory or major archeparchy of the Catholic Church in Trivandrum, India. The cathedra is at St. Mary's Malankara Syrian Catholic Cathedral in Pattom, Thiruvananthapuram, Kerala. The Archeparchy of Trivandrum is a metropolitan see with four suffragan eparchies.

History
The Archeparchy of Trivandrum was erected in 1932.  Its suffragan eparchies are Marthandom, Mavelikara, Pathanamthitta and St. Ephrem of Khadki.

Major Archbishop-Catholicos
Baselios Cardinal Cleemis, Major Archbishop of Trivandrum and Catholicos of the Syro-Malankara Catholic Church, was elected Major Archbishop of Trivandrum in 2007.

Statistics
In 2020 the Archeparchy had an estimated 1,81,400 faithful, in 217 parishes, with 151 diocesan priests, 34 religious priests, 19 religious brothers, 642 religious sisters, and 89 seminarians.

Saints and causes for canonisation
Geevarghese Ivanios

References

Seminaries
 St. Mary’s Malankara Major Seminary
 St. Aloysius Seminary, Thiruvananthapuram

External links
 Archeparchy info from the Syro-Malankara Catholic Church website
 Major Archdiocese of Trivandrum

Syro-Malankara Catholic dioceses
Dioceses in Kerala
Dioceses established in the 20th century
1932 establishments in India
Christian organizations established in 1932
Churches in Thiruvananthapuram district